Rafik Saïfi (born 7 February 1975) is an Algerian retired professional football player who played as a forward or as an attacking midfielder.

Club career
Saifi began his football career at CM Bordj El Kifane. It was there where he got a name for himself as a goal scorer at the age of 17. He went on to represent two other small teams, IRB Sougueur and IB Khémis El Khechna, before making his big move to MC Alger in his home city. There he helped the team win the Algerian league title before moving to France in 1999 at the age of 24 to join Troyes AC. He stayed with Troyes for five seasons, including the 2003–04 season after their relegation to Ligue 2.

Moving back into Ligue 1 with a transfer to newly promoted FC Istres in 2004, Saïfi played 35 matches before leaving following the club's relegation. In 2005, he joined AC Ajaccio, also newly promoted, and suffered a third relegation in four years. 

Saïfi moved to FC Lorient, yet another newly promoted club, in the summer of 2006. He started the 2007–08 campaign quickly scoring 4 goals in 4 games.

Al Khor
On 9 August 2009, Saïfi joined Al-Khor on a one-year contract with the club paying a transfer fee of €500,000 to FC Lorient. Saïfi scored his first goal for the club on his league debut in a match against Al-Gharafa on 12 September 2009. On 22 October 2009, he scored his second league goal, this time against Al-Kharitiyath.

Istres
On 23 January 2010, it was announced that Saïfi would be loaned out to Ligue 2 side FC Istres until the end of the season. The move was made official on 2 February 2010.

On 4 November 2010, Saïfi signed a contract with Amiens SC.

International career
Saïfi made his debut for the Algeria national team on 5 June 1998, in a friendly against Bulgaria, coming on as a substitute in the 65th minute. On 28 February 1999, he scored his first international goal in the 2000 African Cup of Nations qualifier against Liberia which ended as 1–1 draw. He scored his second goal in the following game, a 4–1 win in the return leg against Liberia.

Saïfi was called up by Algeria head coach Nasser Sandjak to the Algerian national team that was taking part in the 2000 African Cup of Nations in Ghana and Nigeria. In the first game against DR Congo, Saïfi started the game and was subbed off in the 70th minute, with the game ending in a goalless draw. In the second group game against Gabon, Saïfi was left out of the starting line-up and was a substitute on the bench but he did take part as he came on in the 77th minute, replacing his Troyes AC teammate Farid Ghazi. Algeria won the game 3–1. He did not take part in the final group game against South Africa. In the quarter-final against Cameroon, Saïfi was left on the bench again but came on in the 51st minute with Algeria losing 2–0. The team managed to pull a goal back in the 90th minute but lost the game 2–1. 

Saïfi was a member of the Algeria team]] that participated in the 2002 African Cup of Nations in Mali and started all three group games against Nigeria, Liberia and hosts Mali. Despite the fact that Algeria failed to make it out of the group stage, Saïfi put in a "best eleven" performance and was included in the team of the tournament.

Saïfi was made his third trip to the African Cup after being included by Algeria manager Rabah Saadane in the team list for the 2010 African Cup of Nations in Angola. He started in Algeria's first game against Malawi, a 3–0 loss, but was subbed off in the 63rd minute by Abdelmalek Ziaya. He started the second game against Mali, a 1–0 win, on the bench and came on in the 80th minute for Abdelkader Ghezzal.

After the FIFA World Cup 2010, he clearly announced through the Tunisian TV channel Nessma, that he was done with his international career.

Assault incident
After a disappointing campaign by Algeria in the 2010 FIFA World Cup in which the team received much domestic criticism,
 failing to make it beyond the group stage, a controversial incident occurred at the end of the USA-Algeria game in which the USA secured victory in the last minute. Saïfi spotted journalist Asma Halimi, a female reporter who had written an article criticizing him in the newspaper Competition. Saïfi and the journalist had previously been in a dispute because the journalist had translated and published an interview Saïfi had given. He slapped her across the face; Halimi responded by striking him back in the face, catching her nail on his lip. Halimi stated she would file a complaint against Saïfi with governing body FIFA and the Algerian FA.

Career statistics

International

Scores and results list Algeria's goal tally first, score column indicates score after each Saïfi goal.

Honours
MC Alger
 Algerian Championnat National: 1998–99

Troyes
 UEFA Intertoto Cup: 2001

Amiens
 Championnat National runner-up: 2010–11

Individual
 DZFoot d'Or: 2007, 2008
 Algerian Ballon d’Or (Ballon d’Or El Haddaf): 2008
 Africa Cup of Nations Team of the Tournament: 2002

References

External links
 
 

1975 births
Living people
Algerian footballers
Kabyle people
Footballers from Algiers
Association football midfielders
Algeria international footballers
2000 African Cup of Nations players
2002 African Cup of Nations players
2010 Africa Cup of Nations players
2010 FIFA World Cup players
Ligue 1 players
Ligue 2 players
Qatar Stars League players
ES Troyes AC players
FC Istres players
AC Ajaccio players
FC Lorient players
Amiens SC players
MC Alger players
Al-Khor SC players
IB Khémis El Khechna players
Algerian expatriate footballers
Algerian expatriate sportspeople in France
Expatriate footballers in France
Algerian expatriate sportspeople in Qatar
Expatriate footballers in Qatar
21st-century Algerian people